Defendant, Stand Up! (Italian: Imputato, alzatevi!) is a 1939 Italian comedy film directed by Mario Mattoli and starring Erminio Macario, Ernesto Almirante and Greta Gonda. It was shown as part of a retrospective on Italian comedy at the 67th Venice International Film Festival.

It was shot at the Cinecittà Studios in Rome. The film's sets were designed by the art director Piero Filippone.

Plot
Italy, late 1930s. Cipriano, nurse and handyman in the pediatric clinic of a doctor his foster brother, is wrongly accused of having committed a murder. The process, however, proves his innocence, and Cipriano become so popular as to obtain a theatrical writing for a show that tells the true story of the murder. But the culprit is still there.

Cast
 Erminio Macario as Cipriano Duval
 Leila Guarni as Giorgetta
 Ernesto Almirante as André Copersche, il presidente del tribunal
 Greta Gonda as La cantante afona
 Enzo Biliotti as L'avvocato Gaveneau
 Carlo Rizzo as Il medico
 Armando Migliari as Il ladro Vetriolo
 Lola Braccini as La portinaia
 Arturo Bragaglia as Il proprietario del tabarin 'Mariette'
 Felice Romano as Il commissario
 Lauro Gazzolo as L'uomo dagli schiaffi

References

Bibliography
 Ernesto G. Laura. Comedy Italian Style. A.N.I.C.A., 1981.

External links

1939 films
1939 comedy films
Italian comedy films
1930s Italian-language films
Italian black-and-white films
Films directed by Mario Mattoli
Films shot at Cinecittà Studios
Courtroom films
1930s Italian films